Below is a list of presidents of Clark University in Worcester, Massachusetts.

References

 
Clark